The 2018 IKF European Korfball Championship First Round was held in Budapest, Hungary on 28 and 29 October 2017. The tournament served as the first round of the 2018 IKF European Korfball Championships to be held in the Netherlands in 2018, with both the winner and runner-up qualifying for the 2018 IKF European Korfball B-Championship. Hungary and Serbia qualified on 29 October 2017 as they won their semi-final matches against Ireland and Greece respectively. Later that same day, Hungary beat Serbia to win the tournament.

Participating teams
Eight teams participated in the tournament: Armenia, Greece, Hungary, Ireland, Serbia, Sweden, Switzerland and Ukraine. For Switzerland and Ukraine this was the first international tournament.

Group stage
Two groups (A and B) of four teams were drawn, with each team playing the other teams in their group once. The top two teams in these groups will move to the semi-finals. The other teams will also be paired with a team from the other group in the same position, to playoff for overall position.

All group stage matches were played at the Gabányi László Sportcsarnok in Budapest on 28 October 2017.

Group A

|}

Key: G denotes win by golden goal.

Group B

|}

Semi-finals

5th–8th place play-offs
The teams finishing third in both groups played a match to determine fifth place, the teams finish fourth to determine seventh place.

|}

Final standing

References

External links
Official website

European Korfball Championship
2017 in korfball
2017 in Hungarian sport
International sports competitions hosted by Hungary
Korfball in Hungary